Aleksandr Yevgenyevich Nikulin (born 19 January 1985) is a former Russian professional football player.

Club career
He made his Russian Football National League debut for FC Petrotrest St. Petersburg on 26 July 2005 in a game against FC Khimki.

External links
 
 Player profile on www.soccernet.ee

1985 births
Living people
Russian footballers
Russian expatriate footballers
Expatriate footballers in Moldova
FC Zimbru Chișinău players
JK Sillamäe Kalev players
Expatriate footballers in Estonia
Russian expatriate sportspeople in Moldova
Meistriliiga players
Association football forwards
FC Petrotrest players
FC Lokomotiv Saint Petersburg players
FC Zenit-2 Saint Petersburg players
Russian expatriate sportspeople in Estonia